Apha horishana is a moth in the family Eupterotidae. It was described by Shōnen Matsumura in 1927. It is found in Taiwan and southern China.

The wingspan is 40–50 mm.

References

Moths described in 1927
Eupterotinae